Albadr Football Club (Persian: باشگاه فوتبال البدر) is an Iranian football club based in Kong, Iran. They currently compete in the Iran Football's 2nd Division.

In 2011, the club bought the license of Ariyana Gostar Kish F.C. in the 2nd Division League.

Season-by-Season
The table below shows the achievements of the club in various competitions.

See also
 2011-12 Hazfi Cup
 2011–12 Iran Football's 2nd Division

References

External links
 

Football clubs in Iran
Association football clubs established in 2010
2010 establishments in Iran